This is a list of Eritrean regions by Human Development Index as of 2021.

See also
List of countries by Human Development Index

References 

Eritrea
Regions by Human Development Index
Eritrea